This is a list of electoral results for the Electoral division of MacDonnell in Northern Territory elections.

Members for MacDonnell

Election results

Elections in the 2000s

Elections in the 1990s

Elections in the 1980s

Elections in the 1970s

 Preferences were not distributed.

 Preferences were not distributed.

References

Northern Territory electoral results by district